A funeral march (Marche funèbre in French, Marcia funebre in Italian, Trauermarsch in German, Marsz żałobny in Polish), as a musical genre, is a march, usually in a minor key, in a slow "simple duple" metre, imitating the solemn pace of a funeral procession. Some such marches are often considered appropriate for use during funerals and other sombre occasions, the best-known example being the third movement of Chopin's Piano Sonata No. 2. Handel uses the name dead march, also used for marches played by a military band at military funerals.

Examples 
 The Marche funèbre second movement of Charles-Valentin Alkan's Symphony for Solo Piano, Op. 39, No. 5.
 Alkan's "Funeral March on the Death of a Parrot" for four-part chorus, three oboes, and bassoon.
 The second movement of Ludwig van Beethoven's Symphony No. 3 (Eroica): Marcia funebre: Adagio assai.
 The third movement of Beethoven's Piano Sonata No. 12: Maestoso andante, marcia funebre sulla morte d'un eroe
 Funeral March No.1, formerly attributed to Beethoven (WoO Anhang 13), believed to be by Johann Heinrich Walch, played annually at the National Service of Remembrance at The Cenotaph, Whitehall, and played during possession in British State Funerals.
 The Funeral March for the Final Scene of Hamlet by Hector Berlioz.
 The eighth variation from Benjamin Britten's Variations on a Theme of Frank Bridge, Op. 10: Variation 8: Funeral March.
 Marche funèbre for piano written by Frédéric Chopin in 1837, which became the 3rd movement of his Piano Sonata No. 2 in B-flat minor, Op. 35.
 Chopin's Marche funèbre for piano in C minor, Op. posth. 72, No. 2.
 The second movement of Ferdinand David's Concertino for Trombone and Orchestra: Marcia funebre (Andante).
 The Trauermarsch written by Anton Diabelli in memory of Michael Haydn for solo guitar.
 Introduction and Funeral March in Edward Elgar's Grania and Diarmid, Op. 42, the score for the play Diarmuid and Grania.
 The "Funeral Music" for Akhnaten's father in Act I of the opera Akhnaten, by Philip Glass.
 The Funeral March of a Marionette by Charles Gounod (1872); this later became known to contemporary audiences as the theme music used for the Alfred Hitchcock Presents television series (1955–65)
 The Funeral March in Memory of Rikard Nordraak by Edvard Grieg.
 The Marche funèbre et chant séraphique (Funeral March and Seraphic Song), for organ, Op.17, No.3, by Alexandre Guilmant.
 The Dead March from Saul by George Frideric Handel.
 Franz Liszt's Marche funèbre, En mémoire de Maximilian I, Empereur du Mexique ("Funeral march, In memory of Maximilian I, Emperor of Mexico") from Années de pèlerinage, Book 3.
 Liszt's Trauervorspiel und Trauermarsch, S.206 (written in 1885 (the year before he died), and published three years later in 1888)
 The third movement of Gustav Mahler's first symphony, "Funeral March in the Manner of Callot" based on "Bruder Martin", the German minor-key variant of the children's song "Frère Jacques.", and the Trauermarsch opening movement of his Symphony No. 5.
 Song Without Words, Op. 62, No. 3, by Felix Mendelssohn: Andante maestoso: Trauermarsch
 The funeral march for Lìu in the opera Turandot, by Giacomo Puccini.
 The second movement of Ferdinand Ries's Symphony No. 1: Marche funebre.
 The fifth movement of Dmitri Shostakovich's String Quartet No. 15: Funeral march: Adagio molto.
 The funeral march In Memoriam by Jean Sibelius.
 "Siegfried's Funeral March" from Götterdämmerung by Richard Wagner.
 The fourth piece from Anton Webern's 6 Pieces for Orchestra, Op. 6: Langsam, marcia funebre.

See also 
 Dirge

References

March music
Death music
Acknowledgements of death
Funerals
Funerary and memorial compositions